DEEN Singles +1 is the first greatest hits album by Japanese pop-rock band Deen. It was released on 18 March 1998 under B-Gram Records label. Album includes all singles by chronological release. Some singles are included for the first time on the album, such as "Tsubasa wo Hiroget", "Mirai no Tameni", "Yume de Aru you ni", "Tooi Sora de" or "Kimi ga Inai Natsu". A bonus track is included as well. The album reached #1 in its first week and charted for 18 weeks, selling more than 781,000 copies. It's the last album being released under B-Gram Records agency and moving into Berg label.

Track listing

References

Being Inc. compilation albums
1998 compilation albums
Deen (band) albums
Japanese-language compilation albums